The Cross Bath in Bath Street, Bath, Somerset, England is a historic pool for bathing. The surrounding structure of the pool was built, in the style of Robert Adam by Thomas Baldwin by 1784 and remodelled by John Palmer in 1789. It is recorded in the National Heritage List for England as a designated Grade I listed building, and was restored during the 1990s by Donald Insall Associates.

Geology
The water which bubbles up from the ground at Bath, fell as rain on the nearby Mendip Hills. Under pressure, the heated water rises to the surface along fissures and faults in the limestone. This process is similar to an artificial one known as Enhanced Geothermal System which also makes use of the high pressures and temperatures below the Earth's crust. Hot water at a temperature of  rises here at the rate of  every day, from a geological fault (the Pennyquick fault).

History
The name Cross Bath is believed to commemorate the body of St Aldhelm resting there on its journey from Doulting to Malmesbury Abbey in 709.

The healing powers of the bath were one of the reasons for the foundation of St John's Hospital, Bath around 1180, by Bishop Reginald Fitz Jocelin, which is among the oldest almshouses in England.

In the 16th to 18th centuries the baths were frequently visited by royalty, increasing their popularity. In June 1688, Mary of Modena, wife of King James II, gave birth to a son, Prince James nine months after bathing in the Cross Bath. The Melfort Cross, was erected in 1688 to celebrate the birth.

The structure surrounding the bath was built by Thomas Baldwin in 1784 and remodelled by John Palmer in 1789. The bath was refurbished in the 1990s, by Donald Insall Associates. Access is now administered in conjunction with the adjacent Thermae Bath Spa.

See also
 List of Grade I listed buildings in Bath and North East Somerset

Further reading
 Water Purification at Cross Bath

References

Infrastructure completed in 1789
Grade I listed buildings in Bath, Somerset
Ancient Roman baths
Roman town of Bath
Roman religious sites in England
Spa waters
Tourist attractions in Bath, Somerset
1789 establishments in England
Public baths in the United Kingdom
Mary of Modena